Chedoke may refer to:

Chedoke Creek
Chedoke Falls
Highway 403 (Ontario), also known as the Chedoke Expressway